The 1946 New Mexico Lobos football team represented the University of New Mexico in the Border Conference during the 1946 college football season. In their fifth and final season under head coach Willis Barnes, the Lobos compiled a 5–5–2 record (4–2–1 against conference opponents), finished third in the Border Conference, tied with Montana State in the 1947 Harbor Bowl, and were outscored by opponents by a total of 224 to 127.

At a ceremony held on November 16, 1946, the athletic field was renamed Zimmerman Field in honor of James F. Zimmerman, who was president of the University from 1927 to 1944.

Schedule

References

New Mexico
New Mexico Lobos football seasons
New Mexico Lobos football